Ghar Ek Mandir is a 1984 Indian Hindi-language drama film directed by K.Bapaiah, starring Shashi Kapoor, Mithun Chakraborty, Ranjeeta, Moushumi Chatterjee, Shakti Kapoor, Kader Khan and Raj Kiran. The film was remade in Tamil as Anni starring Mohan and Saritha.

Plot 

A joint family consisting of three brothers Prem (Shashi Kapoor), Vijay (Raj Kiran) and Ravi (Mithun Chakraborty) are leading a happy and prosperous life. They consider their house temple of Love. However, destiny has its own plans for them when Prem gets killed. Seth Dharampal (Kader Khan) also wants to cheat them. Would Ravi alone be able to save his home? Would Seth Dharampal succeed in his evil intentions?

Cast 

Shashi Kapoor as Prem
Mithun Chakraborty as Ravi
Raj Kiran as Vijay
Moushumi Chatterjee as Laxmi
Ranjeeta
Shoma Anand as Sapna
Suresh Oberoi as Rahim, Prem's Family friend
Kader Khan as Seth Dharamdas
Shakti Kapoor as Shera
Prem Chopra as Sahu
Asrani
Aruna Irani
Prema Narayan as Sapna Friend
Viju Khote
Yusuf Khan
Satyendra Kapoor as Shop Owner
Rajendra Nath as Auctioneer

Soundtrack

References

External links 
 
http://www.ibosnetwork.com/asp/filmbodetails.asp?id=Ghar+Ek+Mandir

1984 films
1980s Hindi-language films
Indian action films
Films directed by K. Bapayya
Films scored by Laxmikant–Pyarelal
1984 action films
Hindi-language action films
Hindi films remade in other languages